Lincoln G Asquith (born 1964), is a male former athlete who competed for England.

Athletics career
Asquith represented England and won a silver medal in the 4 x 100 metres relay event with Daley Thompson, Mike McFarlane and Clarence Callender, at the 1986 Commonwealth Games in Edinburgh, Scotland.

From 2006 until 2010 he was the escort of the visually impaired athlete Libby Clegg.

References

1964 births
English male sprinters
Commonwealth Games medallists in athletics
Commonwealth Games silver medallists for England
Athletes (track and field) at the 1986 Commonwealth Games
Living people
Medallists at the 1986 Commonwealth Games